Junior Gourrier (born 12 April 1992) is a Central African footballer who plays for Gabonese club Cercle Mbéri Sportif.

International career

International goals
Scores and results list Central African Republic's goal tally first.

References

External links 
 
 

1992 births
People from Bangui
Living people
Association football midfielders
Central African Republic footballers
Central African Republic international footballers
Central African Republic expatriate footballers
Expatriate footballers in Gabon
AS Pélican players